Blanice is a river located primarily in the Central Bohemian Region of the Czech Republic.

From there it flows northward through Mladá Vožice, and the Central Bohemian cities of Louňovice pod Blaníkem, Vlašim, and Libež.

References

Rivers of the Central Bohemian Region
Rivers of the South Bohemian Region